Atal Bihari Vajpayee Government Medical College (Hindi: अटल बिहारी वाजपेयी शास्किय चिकित्सा महाविद्यालय) is a government medical college in Vidisha, Madhya Pradesh. It was established in 2018. The college offers the degree of Bachelor of Medicine and Bachelor of Surgery (MBBS). Nursing and para-medical courses are also offered. The college is affiliated to Madhya Pradesh Medical Science University and is recognized by Medical Council of India (now NMC). The selection to the college is done on the basis of merit through National Eligibility and Entrance Test. The number of students admitted in 2018 was 150 whereas in 2019 the batch strength was increased to 180 students.

Following hospital is associated with the college-

 Atal Bihari Vajpayee Government Medical College & Hospital, Vidisha

Location 

The college is located in front of khel parisar, Sanchi road, Vidisha, Madhya Pradesh.

Campus 
The campus has following-

 Main college building
 Affiliated hospital (ABVGMC&H)
 Central Library
 Rain Basera (for patients and their relatives stay)
 Residential complex (for students, residents, professors, nurses, dean and medical superintendent)
 Guest House & Gym
 Sports ground (Khel Parisar- opposite the college campus)
 Badminton court (within college building)
 Central Virology Lab

Courses
ABVGMC undertakes the education and training of students MBBS courses. From 2021, it also started the diploma and certificate paramedical courses.

References

External links 
http://gmcvidisha.org/

2018 establishments in Madhya Pradesh
Affiliates of Madhya Pradesh Medical Science University
Educational institutions established in 2018
Medical colleges in Madhya Pradesh